WR 102c is a Wolf–Rayet star located in the constellation Sagittarius towards the galactic centre.  It is only a few parsecs from the Quintuplet Cluster, within the Sickle Nebula.

Features
According to recent estimations, WR 102c is as much as 500,000 times brighter than the Sun.  An initial study reporting a much higher luminosity mistakenly used photometry from a nearby star.  It would have formed as a  O-type main-sequence star a few million years ago and has since spent a period as a red supergiant before losing its outer layers completely.  It is now almost hydrogen-free and nearing the end of its life.  It will collapse within the next few hundred thousand years as it runs out of fuel in its core, producing a type Ib or Ic supernova or collapsing directly into a black hole.

WR 102c is surrounded by a shell of nebulosity which contains dust made even hotter than the star itself by intense radiation.

There is a suggestion that WR 102c may be a binary star. A nearby corkscrew-shaped jet of nebulosity could have been expelled during the orbital motion. which would imply a period of 800 - 1,400 days.

References

Sagittarius (constellation)
Wolf–Rayet stars